This was the first edition of the tournament.

Sanchai and Sonchat Ratiwatana won the title after defeating Chen Ti and Danai Udomchoke 7–6(7–5), 5–7, [10–7] in the final.

Seeds

Draw

References
 Main Draw

Maccabi Men's Challenger - Doubles